The Sigulda bobsleigh, luge, and skeleton track is located in Sigulda, Latvia, built in 1986. Currently, the track manager is Dainis Dukurs, former bobsleigh brakeman and the father of skeleton racers Martins and Tomass Dukurs.

History
Sledding took place in Sigulda as early as 1887. Several alpine skiing venues were held near the track following World War II. By the late 1960s, the city government of Sigulda approved the construction of a new track, designed by the Leipzig Sports Facilities Scientific and Technical Centre in East Germany. Construction began in 1984 with the participation of the Yugoslav company Graming d.o.o. and local builders, and the track was finally completed in 1986. It was built primarily for the needs of Soviet bobsledders and lugers, but after the restoration of the independence of Latvia in 1990, the track became the training center for Latvian wintersport athletes.

Although skeleton wasn't initially in the building plan, Sigulda has hosted World Cup races in skeleton since the 2000s. Also, luge competitions are hosted in Sigulda each year, however, the track can't host four-man bobsleigh races, therefore there haven't been any World Championship races hosted in Sigulda, although in the 2018/2019 season a Bobsleigh World Cup stage will take place in Sigulda. Zintis Ekmanis and the original track designers has designed a new layout which would change two curves and make four-man bobsleigh races possible, though some lugers are not happy with this idea, because this may render the track unusable for women's singles and men's doubles lugers. Also, Dainis Dukurs has said in an interview for Sporta Avīze that there was an experiment involving Juris Šics, Andris Šics, Tomass Dukurs and Martins Dukurs, in which the quartet drove with a four-man bobsleigh without crashing. Dukurs stated that this proves that the track is, in fact, suitable for four-man teams, but to make it perfect for bobsleigh, most of the track should be rebuilt. The track will undergo major renovation after 2014 season. Also, an artificial ice start estacade was built in summer of 2008. It would have been used for bobsled, skeleton, and luge events for the 2026 Winter Olympics had the bid of Stockholm–Åre won.

Statistics

No vertical drop, percent grading, or turn names were mentioned.

Championships hosted
FIL European Luge Championships: 1996, 2010, 2014, 2018
FIL World Luge Championships: 2003, 2015

References

External links
Official website
FIBT track profile – Click on video to show run down the track from a skeleton racer's perspective. Men's singles luge intersects with two-man bobsleigh/ skeleton part of the track prior to turn one while women's singles/ men's doubles luge intersect prior to turn four.
FIL-Luge track profile

Sigulda
Bobsleigh, luge, and skeleton tracks
Sports venues in Latvia